A rolling recession, or rolling adjustment recession, occurs when the recession only affects certain sectors of the economy at a time. As one sector enters recovery, the slowdown will ‘roll’ into another part of the economy. On the whole, rolling recessions occur regardless of nationwide or statewide economic recession, and the effects may not be in the national economic measures (e.g., gross domestic product (GDP)). The recession of 1960–61 in the United States is an example of a rolling-adjustment recession.

Causes 

 Recession is caused by high interest rates. The limit of liquidity, or the amount of money available to invest in.
 "With only 7% of the entire world's population, EU trade has 20% of global imports and exports"
 A credit crisis means they cut back on the amount of credit the company is ready by financial institutions, decreasing the amount given households and businesses. by increasing the interest rates on these loans, it will eventually turn into more revenue for the company.
 "During the recession the UK affects the exchange rates, by weakening the pound sterling against other currencies".

Types 
 Boom and Bust Recession
 Balance Sheet Recession
 Depression
 Supple Side Stock Recession
 Different Shaped Recession

History 

There have been five major recessions that occurred in the 1900s. The specific years were as follows; 
 1974 
 1975
 1980
 1981
 1991
"1991 was financially the hardest year to overcome"

"During the year of 1990's recession struck by 2.2% increasing nearly 1% from 1974 and 1991"

"Through the year of the 1970's oil price shock helped cause larger contractions"

Harsh recessions in 1950+ 
 1975 - 0.6% fell
 1974 & 1991 - 1.4% fell
 1981 - 1.5% fell
 1980 - 2.1% fell

Boom and bust recession 
There were recent recession following the recent economic boom taking place in the economic upturn, the economic growth also above, long trend growth rate; this rapid growth has caused inflation. 

 During the time of a boom, consumer confidence level has decreased, this means that there is a decrease in the savings ratio and an increase in private lending. 
 An increase in debt payment leads to consumers changing their behaviour, instead of seeking to borrowing, the consumers  pay off their debt leading to the saving ratio to decrease in time.
 Governments and banks see inflation and notice that it is getting intense, they use this to implement the monetary policy & the fiscal policy.

Balance sheet recession 

A balance sheet recession happens when companies/banks look over and notice their balance sheet has occurred an error. This is usually caused by a variety of losses. Banks must stop giving money to clients for a short period of time, as this can lead to a decrease in fall in investment spending.

For example, in 2008 the banks let losses fall, with a decline of money leading in bank liquidity banks in general found it hard to borrow money to keep their business intact, it was hard for banks to find ways of borrowing money for investment due to their previous records, this led to the economy falling into recession despite there being APR.

Negative Impacts of a Balance Sheet 
 Limited growth
 Dividend restrictions 
 Takes time to recovery 
 Can last a long time

Depression 
Depression can lead to a high increase of unemployment. It is more likely a balance sheet recession can cause depression. Due to falling asset prices and bank losses, this has a large impact on economic activity.

Recession is common in many countries; it is all part of the business cycle. Depression means there is a fall in economic activity lasting for a number of years. Economists will not agree with depression as they believe it is plagued by declining economic activity However, there are other economists that argue depression continues up until the point that the activity has returned to its original state.

Supply side shock recession 
As oil prices are increasing, it can cause recession due to the decline in living standards. In this day, there is a high demand of oil, oil has increased in price throughout the years hence the demand for it.

Negative impacts of supply side shock recession 
 Not many people are aware of supply side shock recession, the world is more dependent on oil than in the 1970s.
 The increase in oil prices in 2008 was a major factor causing 2008 to be in recession.
 It has causes aggregate supple to shift, this means businesses can get lower output and higher inflation, this is called "stagflation".
 "Wage level affect firms"
 "Productivity of factors, e.g. labour"

See also
Recession shapes
List of recessions in the United States
List of recessions in the United Kingdom

References

Recessions